Gijbori is a town, and one of twenty union councils of Battagram District in Khyber Pakhtunkhwa province of Pakistan.
Also a part and a big village of Deshan Territory. It comprises many small villages. These include Sarkheli banda is head village of this union council Torkhail clan is living here and this clan take important role in politics of this union council and also of all district. 

® Head Village ; Sarkheli Banda 

 Kiar Gali Latif Khan, 
 Shingli Bala, 
 Kiargali, 
 Karwar, 
 Malkot, and 
 Kass.
 Kandi, Dehree, Barpaw, and Kuzpaw are the subvillages of Gijbori.

It is located at 34°39'04N 72°59'20E and has an altitude of 1090 metres (3488 feet).

References

Union councils of Battagram District
Populated places in Battagram District